Belwania may refer to 
 Belwania, Bihar, a village in Bihar, India.
 Belwania, Uttar Pradesh, a village in Uttar Pradesh, India.